Tephritis arizonaensis is a species of fruit fly in the family Tephritidae.

Distribution
USA, Mexico.

References

Tephritinae
Insects described in 1951
Diptera of North America